Chang Feng-class destroyer was a class of Chinese destroyer bought from Germany during the naval reconstruction at the end of the Qing dynasty. However, the 1911 Revolution had already broken out before the ships were launched, and they were inherited by the Republic of China when the ships were completed.

The three ships of this class have all experienced the turbulent period of warlord era in the early years of the Republic of China. Among them, the first ship Yu Chang (formerly Chang Feng) was lost after she was wrecked in 1932. At the beginning of the Second Sino-Japanese War in 1937, the remaining two ships, Chien Kang (formerly Fu Po) and Tung An (formerly Fei Hung) were all lost.

They were later repaired by the Japanese and transferred to the puppet Wang Jingwei regime. In 1944, Tung Chun (former Tung An) was abandoned after an uprising by members of Nanjing regime Navy. After the end of the war in 1945, Chien Kang was returned to the Chinese Navy and was retired from the Navy in 1947.

Design and overview
The Qing government intends to rebuilt the navy after the First Sino-Japanese War of 1894-1895 and bought warships from Britain, Germany and other countries. However, the rebuilt fleet suffered another severe damage during the Boxer Rebellion of 1900, and only managed to purchased four Hai Lung-class destroyers. The destroyers were all captured by the coalition forces. In 1909, the Qing government sent a delegation led by Zaixun, Prince Rui to visit European countries, and to order a large number of small and medium-sized warships from those countries. During visit to Germany, Zaixun ordered three destroyers from the Schichau shipyard. The first ship was ordered in 1910 at a cost of 57,965 pounds. A year later, two additional ships were ordered for a total of 115,930 pounds.

During sea trial, the ship reached . The class has a complement of 69 crew.

The class main guns were two 76.2 mm QF 12-pounder 12 cwt naval guns, located on the fore and aft. There are also four 47 mm QF 3-pounder Hotchkiss guns, two of which are installed on the port and starboard sides in front of the conning tower, and the other two are on both sides of the rear command room. The ships also armed with two 18-inch (457 mm) torpedo tubes, which were weaker than the 3-tube configuration of contemporary German destroyers. One was installed between the two funnels and the other was installed behind the aft main gun.

Ships in the class

References

Bibliography

See also
List of ships of the Chinese Navy (1644–1945)

 
Destroyer classes
World War II destroyers
China–Germany relations